Vittorio Grigolo (correctly Vittorio Grigòlo, born 19 February 1977) is an Italian operatic tenor.

Early life
Grigolo was born in Arezzo and raised in Rome. He began singing by the age of four. When he was nine years old he accompanied his mother to have her eyes tested and, hearing someone singing from another room, he spontaneously began his own rendition of "Ave Maria". The singer, the optician's father, was so impressed that he insisted Grigolo have an audition for the Sistine Chapel Choir as soon as possible. Young Vittorio was chosen to become part of Sistine Chapel Choir as a soloist. He then studied for five years at the Schola Puerorum at the Sistine Chapel. At age 13 he played the Pastorello in a performance of Tosca at Teatro dell'Opera di Roma, where he shared the stage with Luciano Pavarotti  and was given the nickname 'Il Pavarottino'. When 18, Vittorio joined the Vienna Opera Company. He became the youngest man to perform in Milan's La Scala at age 23. He also raced Pre-3000 Formula cars for a while until an accident limited his opportunities in this field.

Allegations of inappropriate behavior
In September 2019 Grigolo was dismissed firstly by the Royal Opera House Covent Garden on the grounds of inappropriate behavior during the Royal Opera's tour in Japan. His contracts with the Metropolitan Opera were subsequently also cancelled.

Repertory
Giuseppe Verdi: Don Carlo, I Due Foscari, Un Ballo in Maschera, Luisa Miller, Messa da Requiem, Rigoletto, La Traviata, Il Corsaro;
Gaetano Donizetti: L´Elisir d’Amore, Don Sebastiano, La Favorita, Anna Bolena, Lucrezia Borgia & Lucia di Lammermoor
Giacomo Puccini: La Bohème, Tosca, Madama Butterfly;
Charles Gounod: Faust, Roméo et Juliette;
Gioachino Rossini: Petite Messe Solennelle, Stabat Mater;
Wolfgang Amadeus Mozart: Idomeneo, Così fan tutte;
Jules Massenet: Werther, Manon;
Leonard Bernstein: West Side Story;
Jacques Offenbach: Les Contes d’Hoffmann;

Awards
The European Commission of the EU granted Grigolo and Romano Musumarra a European Border Breakers Award, along with the record company, authors and publishers, for recording the highest sales for a debut album in 2006 within the European Union, but outside of its country of production.

Nominations
Grammy Award 2008 for Best Musical Show Album - West Side Story

Discography

Albums

Singles

DVD

Recorded at  Hadrian's Villa in Tivoli, Italy. A live performance of tracks from his album, as well as a few additional pieces. The DVD was recorded specifically for the Great Performances series on PBS TV USA.

Grigolo plays Cassio in Giuseppe Verdi Otello recorded at Gran Teatre del Liceu Barcelona 2006

Appearances
'Camillo de Rossillon' in La vedova allegra at Roma Opera House, Rome December 2007
'Rodolfo' in La bohème at the Kennedy Center Opera House, Washington, D.C. September 2007 and at Zurich Opera House, October/November 2009.
Stabat Mater by Rossini at Sydney Opera House Australia, May 2007
'Alfredo' in La traviata at Roma Opera Theatre April 2007, at Théâtre Antique d'Orange, Les Chorégies d'Orange, 11 & 15 July 2009, at La Fenice September 2009, Deutsche Oper Berlin September 2009/March 2010
'Cassio' in Otello at the Liceu, Barcelona February 2006.
'Il Duca de Mantova' in Rigoletto at Hamburg State Opera, September/October 2005.
'Don Carlos' in Don Carlos at Geneva Opera House, June 2008.
'Edgardo' in Lucia di Lammermoor at Zurich Opera House, September 2008.
 Rigoletto, live from Mantua, 2010 RAI film version of Rigoletto, performed live on location in Mantua, Italy and broadcast simultaneously in 148 countries.
'Rodolfo' in La bohème at the Metropolitan Opera, New York, October 2010.  It was his debut with the company.
'Corrado' in Il corsaro at Zurich Opera House, November 2009/January 2010.
'Hoffmann' in Les contes d'Hoffmann at Zurich Opera House, March/April 2010.
 'Duke of Mantua in Rigoletto at the Metropolitan Opera, New York, 2013
 'Rodolfo' in La bohème at the Metropolitan Opera, New York, 2014
 'Hoffmann' in "Les Contes d'Hoffmann" at the Metropolitan Opera, New York, January/February 2015
 'Romeo' in "Romeo et Juliette" at the Metropolitan Opera, New York, 2017
 'Nemorino' in "L'Elisir d'Amore" at the Royal Opera House, Covent Garden, 2017

References

External links

 Grigolo's official website

1977 births
Living people
Italian operatic tenors
Opera crossover singers
People from Arezzo
Singers from Rome
21st-century Italian male  opera singers
20th-century Italian  male opera singers